These are the full results of the 2014 South American Under-23 Championships in Athletics which took place between October 3 and October 5, 2014, at Pista Darwin Piñeyrúa in Montevideo, Uruguay.

Men's results

100 meters

Heat 1 – 3 October 10:00h - Wind: 1.6 m/s

Heat 2 – 3 October 10:00h - Wind: 0.9 m/s

Heat 3 – 3 October 10:00h - Wind: 0.6 m/s

Heat 4 – 3 October 10:00h - Wind: 1.0 m/s

Final – 3 October 17:10h - Wind: 0.3 m/s

200 meters

Heat 1 – 5 October 9:30h - Wind: 1.6 m/s

Heat 2 – 5 October 9:30h - Wind: -0.2 m/s

Final – 5 October 15:20h - Wind: 1.4 m/s

400 meters

Heat 1 – 3 October 10:55h

Heat 2 – 3 October 10:55h

Final – 3 October 18:00h

800 meters

Heat 1 – 4 October 10:40h

Heat 2 – 4 October 10:40h

Final – 4 October 17:20h

1500 meters
Final – 5 October 16:20h

5000 meters
Final – 3 October 15:50h

10,000 meters
Final – 4 October 15:50h

110 meters hurdles
Final – 4 October 15:30h - Wind: 2.2 m/s

400 meters hurdles
Final – 5 October 16:50h

3000 meters steeplechase
Final – 4 October 11:30h

4x100 meters relay
Final – 4 October 18:40h

4x400 meters relay
Final – 5 October 18:10h

20,000 meters walk
Final – 4 October 11:55h

High jump
Final – 5 October 10:00h

Pole vault
Final – 3 October 15:00h

†:Series not exactly known.

Long jump
Final – 4 October 9:00h

Triple jump
Final – 3 October 11:00h

Shot put
Final – 5 October 10:00h

Discus throw
Final – 3 October 17:00h

Hammer throw
Final – 3 October 11:15h

Javelin throw
Final – 5 October 14:15h

Decathlon
Final – 3/4 October

Women's results

100 meters

Heat 1 – 3 October 9:30h - Wind: 2.5 m/s

Heat 2 – 3 October 9:30h - Wind: 0.5 m/s

Final – 3 October 16:40h - Wind: -1.2 m/s

200 meters

Heat 1 – 5 October 9:00h - Wind: 2.3 m/s

Heat 2 – 5 October 9:00h - Wind: 2.8 m/s

Final – 5 October 15:00h - Wind: 0.4 m/s

400 meters

Heat 1 – 3 October 10:30h

Heat 2 – 3 October 10:30h

Final – 3 October 18:30h

800 meters
Final – 4 October 17:45h

1500 meters
Final – 5 October 15:50h

5000 meters
Final – 3 October 15:00h

10,000 meters
Final – 5 October 10:15h

100 meters hurdles

Heat 1 – 4 October 10:10h - Wind: 1.7 m/s

Heat 2 – 4 October 10:10h - Wind: 3.5 m/s

Final – 4 October 15:00h - Wind: 2.4 m/s

400 meters hurdles
Final – 5 October 17:20h

3000 meters steeplechase
Final – 4 October 11:00h

4x100 meters relay
Final – 4 October 18:10h

4x400 meters relay
Final – 5 October 18:40h

20,000 meters walk
Final – 4 October 11:55h

High jump
Final – 5 October 16:00h

Pole vault
Final – 3 October 9:30h

Long jump
Final – 4 October 14:30h

Triple jump
Final – 3 October 8:45h

Shot put
Final – 4 October 16:15h

Discus throw
Final – 3 October 14:15h

Hammer throw
Final – 3 October 8:45h

Javelin throw
Final – 5 October 17:00h

Heptathlon
Final – 4/5 October

Note
The names of the Brazilian athletes were completed using the published list of participants.

References

South American Under-23 Championships in Athletics
Events at the South American Under-23 Championships in Athletics